Warren Seymour Johnson (November 6, 1847 – December 5, 1911) was an American college professor who was frustrated by his inability to regulate individual classroom temperatures. His multi-zone pneumatic control system solved the problem. Johnson’s system for temperature regulation was adopted worldwide for office buildings, schools, hospitals, and hotels – essentially any large building with multiple rooms that required temperature regulation. To manufacture and market his system, Johnson established the Johnson Electric Service Company which eventually became Johnson Controls.

Early life
Johnson was born in Leicester, Vermont, on November 6, 1847. His family moved to Wisconsin three years later, eventually settling in Menomonie, Dunn County, Wisconsin. It appears that he had only limited formal educational training – but supplemented his knowledge with self-study of scientific subjects. He worked for a time as a printer, surveyor, schoolteacher, principal and school superintendent. In 1876, he obtained a teaching position at the State Normal School in Whitewater, now known as the University of Wisconsin–Whitewater. Five years later, he was named professor of natural science.

Johnson’s inventions
Johnson had an inquisitive mind and was particularly interested in electricity. In 1883, he developed a thermostat, which he deployed at the State Normal School. He called the instrument an "electric tele-thermoscope" in the patent application. It was a bi-metal coiled thermostat with a mercury switch, which could be used to ring a bell to alert the fireman to open or close the heating damper. While not the first bi-metal thermostat, Johnson received a patent for the device and interested William Plankinton, heir to the Plankinton Packing Company, to provide financial backing to manufacture the device.  

In 1885, the Johnson Electric Service Company was established in Milwaukee, Wisconsin. Johnson’s most notable contribution to temperature control was the automatic multi-zone temperature control system – a pneumatic system that used a bi-metal thermostat to control air flow through a nozzle and thereby operate a pilot regulator. The amplified air signal from the regulator was then used to control a steam or hot water valve on a heat exchanger, or to control a damper of a forced air system. He received a patent for the system in 1895.

Johnson continued to invent additional control devices, as well as products such as chandeliers, springless door locks, puncture-proof tires, thermometers, and a hose coupling for providing steam heat to passenger railcars. He also designed pneumatic tower clocks, one of which was built for the Milwaukee City Hall tower.

He experimented for a time with wireless communications, forming the American Wireless Telegraph Company. The company’s exhibit at the Paris Exposition Universelle in 1900 won second prize, beating Guglielmo Marconi. A test tower was built several miles south of Milwaukee, but the tests were unsuccessful. For about three months, Lee de Forest, who eventually went on to design the audio vacuum tube that provided the breakthrough for radio, worked on the project with Johnson.

Johnson also sought to form an automobile company, introducing first a steam-powered truck and then a line of automobiles using gasoline-powered engines. The company was among the first to receive a contract to deliver mail with a horseless carriage.

He is credited with more than 50 patents.  He died on December 5, 1911, in Los Angeles of Bright's disease.

References

1847 births
1911 deaths
19th-century American inventors
20th-century American inventors
People from Leicester, Vermont
People from Menomonie, Wisconsin
Businesspeople from Milwaukee
University of Wisconsin–Whitewater faculty
Johnson Controls
19th-century American businesspeople